The 58th Massachusetts General Court, consisting of the Massachusetts Senate and the Massachusetts House of Representatives, met in 1837 during the governorship of Edward Everett. Horace Mann served as president of the Senate and Julius Rockwell served as speaker of the House.

Senators

Representatives

See also
 25th United States Congress
 List of Massachusetts General Courts

References

External links
 
 

Political history of Massachusetts
Massachusetts legislative sessions
massachusetts
1837 in Massachusetts